The 2012–13 New York Rangers season was the franchise's 86th season of play and their 87th season overall. The regular season was reduced from its usual 82 games to 48 due to a lockout. The lockout ended on January 5 when the NHL and NHL Players' Association (NHLPA) reached an agreement. The Rangers defeated the Washington Capitals in the Eastern Conference Quarterfinals, but were defeated by the Boston Bruins in the Eastern Conference Semi-finals. After the Rangers' season ended, John Tortorella was fired as head coach.

Off-season
After speculation that began during the 2011–12 season, Rick Nash was traded to the Rangers in a blockbuster trade on July 23, 2012, giving the Rangers the much-needed scoring winger they were seeking. The Rangers sent forwards Artem Anisimov and Brandon Dubinsky, defenseman Tim Erixon and a first-round draft pick in 2013 to the Blue Jackets in exchange. The Rangers also received minor league defenseman Steven Delisle and a conditional third-round draft pick in 2013 (the condition being that the Rangers make the Stanley Cup Finals in 2013) from Columbus. Nash had been on the trading block since the February 2012 trade deadline, after Nash had requested a trade out of Columbus.

On September 15, the collective bargaining agreement expired and the NHL owners locked-out the league.

Pre-season
The New York Rangers were scheduled to play six exhibition games (all on the road) prior to the beginning of the regular season, but due to the ongoing labor negotiations between the League and the players resulting in a lockout, the NHL cancelled all preseason games in September on September 19. The Rangers were scheduled to play the New Jersey Devils on September 26 (in Albany) and on September 28, and the Philadelphia Flyers on September 29. Later, on September 27, the NHL cancelled the remainder of the pre-season. The Rangers were scheduled to play the New York Islanders on October 4, the Colorado Avalanche on October 6 (in Kansas City, Missouri) and the Los Angeles Kings on October 8.

2012–13 NHL Lockout

On October 4, the first two weeks of the 2012–13 season was cancelled due to the 2012–13 NHL lockout. Cancellations would continue until games for the 2012–13 season were cancelled through January 14, 2013, on December 20, 2012. This was the last set of game cancellations before the NHL and NHLPA came to an agreement on a new CBA on January 6, 2013.

During the lockout, nine New York Rangers (Arron Asham, Brian Boyle, Steve Eminger, Dan Girardi, Jeff Halpern, Henrik Lundqvist, Taylor Pyatt, Brad Richards and Marc Staal) played as part of Team New York in Operation Hat Trick, a charity game to benefit Hurricane Sandy relief efforts. The game was played on November 24, 2012, at Atlantic City's Boardwalk Hall. Team New York beat Team New Jersey 10–6 in front of 10,792 spectators.

Regular season
Once the new CBA was signed, the Rangers were able to open their 2013 training camp on January 13, 2013. The new regular season schedule was announced, with all teams playing within their conference for a shortened 48-game season beginning on January 19.

January
The New York Rangers opened the season on January 19 with a 3–1 loss against the Boston Bruins. They were outshot 34 to 21, and failed to capitalize on a 90-second five-on-three during the third period, when they were trailing 2–1. While Brad Richards attributed the team's poor performance to "rust" from the eight-month layoff, John Tortorella refused to entertain any questions from reporters about the topic. The team fared even worse the next day against the Pittsburgh Penguins, who defeated them 6–3 during New York's first home game at Madison Square Garden. The Rangers gave up two power play goals in the first 30 minutes, and although they scored two of their three goals during the third period, the rally came too late. Lundqvist was pulled from the net in the third period after giving up four goals.

The Rangers captured their first win of the season on January 23, besting the Bruins 4–3 in overtime. Rick Nash, Brad Richards and Marian Gaborik were placed in a line together for the first time and dominated the game, making 15 of the team's 33 shots. Gaborik scored a hat-trick, the 14th of his career and fifth as a Ranger, capturing his third goal on a breakaway 27 seconds into overtime. Zach Parise of the Minnesota Wild would tie Gaborik's mark on February 26, 2013, when he scored 27 seconds into the overtime period to give the Wild a 2–1 home win over the Calgary Flames. Both goals would prove to be the fastest overtime goals scored during the lockout-shortened season. But on January 24, New York lost 1–2 to a previously-winless Philadelphia Flyers, despite Lundqvist making 31 saves and the Flyers lacking their top forwards due to injuries or suspensions. Taylor Pyatt scored his third goal in as many games, but the Gaborik, Richards and Nash line managed only three shots, and the Flyers killed nearly four minutes of consecutive Rangers power play in the third period.

Chris Kreider, who scored five goals during his debut in the 2012 playoffs, was scratched for the Flyers game and would not for the next five games. This led Tortorella to consider sending him back to the American Hockey League, although it was later learned Kreider had been playing since January 5 with a bone chip in his right ankle. The Rangers next earned their first two consecutive wins, beating the Toronto Maple Leafs 5–2 after a two-goal deficit on January 26, followed by Philadelphia 2–1 on January 29. New York sent into the third period against Toronto trailing 1–2, but won after a four-goal rally in the third period. Gáborík captured two goals, bringing his season total to five. The Rangers outshot the Maple Leafs 42 to 17, but failed to score on four power plays.

Against Philadelphia, Ryan Callahan scored a goal to earn his 200th career point, but suffered a left shoulder subluxation during a third period fight with Maxime Talbot, an injury that was expected to make him miss up to 14 days. The Flyers only goal came on the power play shortly after Callahan left, raising concerns about how his absence would affect the Ranger's penalty killing and defensive forward play. The Rangers ended the month with a 0–3 loss to the Pittsburgh Penguins on January 31, the team's first shutout loss in 31 regular season games. New York failed to score on four power plays without Callahan and surrendered seven penalties, including their fourth penalty for too many men on the ice in seven games, the most of any team in the league.

February
The Rangers won their third in four games with a 3–2 victory over the Tampa Bay Lightning on February 2, but lost 3–1 to the New Jersey Devils on February 5, a game in which Chris Kreider scored his first regular season goal. Afterward, John Tortorella said the Rangers played too "scared" and "tentative." However, the team went on to win four of their next five games, starting with a 4–1 victory against the New York Islanders on February 7 that also marked the return of Ryan Callahan. Nineteen-year-old rookie forward J. T. Miller scored two goals, marking the Rangers' first multi-goal Madison Square Garden debut since Chris Kontos in 1993. Miller scored the team's only fourth power play goal out of 37 opportunities, giving them the worst power play record of the season at that point. Brian Boyle was a healthy scratch and missed a total of three games due to poor performance.

The Rangers defeated the Tampa Bay Lightning 5–1 on February 10, and beat the Boston Bruins in overtime on February 12. Boston tied game with a three-goal rally in the third period, including two goals in 91 seconds with the goaltender pulled, but Callahan made the game-winning shootout goal in the fourth round. During that game, the Rangers received their sixth penalty of the season for too many men on the ice, the most of any team in the league. They lost 3–4 in overtime against the New York Islanders on February 14, surrendering a 0–2 lead after the Islanders scored three goals in seven minutes during the second period. Hagelin scored his fourth goal in three games to tie the game, but they lost in an overtime shootout when Gaborik's and Nash's shots were stopped. The Rangers beat the Washington Capitals 2–1 on February 17, bringing New York to seventh place and putting them in playoff contention for the first time all season.

Darroll Powe left the game with a concussion after accidentally colliding with Washington's Matt Hendricks and landing on his head. He was placed on injured reserve and missed the next three games, and Brandon Mashinter was called up from Whale to fill in for him in that time. Nash also missed the next four games due to an unspecified injury widely suspected to be a concussion. His absence corresponded with a four-game losing streak for the Rangers, starting with a 3–1 loss to the Montreal Canadiens on February 19. Arron Asham missed the next five games after that due to back spasms. New York lost 3–2 in overtime to the Ottawa Senators on February 21, where Callahan was the only Ranger to score in a seven-round shootout. Michael Del Zotto suffered a lower body injury that took him out of the next two games, and the Rangers briefly recalled Christian Thomas and Steve Eminger from the Whale due to the team's litany of injuries. Tortorella believed the team was struggling with consistency problems, despite what he called strong play in recent games from Carl Hagelin and Derek Stepan.

The Rangers suffered two more injuries during their 0–3 shutout loss to the Canadiens on February 23. McDonagh was hit into the glass by forward Max Pacioretty, requiring 14 stitches near his mouth and forcing him out of the next game. Dan Girardi was injured when a shot by P. K. Subban struck his ankle, but he did not suffer a fracture and missed no games. The Rangers started a four-game homestead on February 26 with a 4–3 loss to the Winnipeg Jets. Callahan received a standing ovation after blocking two shots and making two hits despite lacking a stick, but it failed to rally the Rangers. New York broke their losing streak with a 4–1 win against Tampa Bay on February 28, a game that also saw the return of Nash, Del Zotto and McDonagh. Nash scored a goal and made a career-high 12 shots in the game, and Hagelin scored his seventh goal of the season, tying him with Gaborik as the team's lead goal-scorer. The game brought their season penalty kill percentage to ninth best in the league. Kreider, who had one goal and one assist in 11 games, was sent back to the Whale on February 28.

March
On March 3, the Rangers were trailing the Buffalo Sabres 1–0 at home after two periods. Early in the third, Sabres forward Patrick Kaleta was given a five-minute major and a game misconduct for checking Brad Richards from behind. He would later be given a suspension. Rangers scored on a 5-on-3 opportunity, and then another power play goal. The game was tied by a shorthanded goal from Nathan Gerbe and went into overtime. Rick Nash and Ryan Callahan each scored in the shootout to win it for the Rangers Two days later, the Rangers hosted the Philadelphia Flyers. Ryan Callahan scored a pair of goals in the first period, and Rick Nash scored two in the third to lead the Rangers to a 4–2 victory. On March 7, the Rangers played the Islanders in Nassau Coliseum. Nash scored a late goal to prevent a 1–0 loss, and the game went to overtime. Rangers connected on the power play and Marian Gaborik found the perfect time to get out of his scoring slump. The next day, Rangers lost 3–2 to the Ottawa Senators at home. On March 10, the Rangers topped the Capitals 4–1 in Washington. On March 12, Derek Stepan scored his first NHL short-handed goal against Buffalo, but the Rangers lost 3–1. Two days later, the Rangers were defeated 3–1 in Winnipeg, and two days after that, they were shutout 3–0 in Pittsburgh. On March 18, Rangers ended their three-game slump by beating the Carolina Hurricanes 2–1 in a shootout. The next day, the Rangers traveled to New Jersey. Michael Del Zotto gave the Rangers a 1–0 lead, but the Devils were quick to tie it. Carl Hagelin gave them a 2–1 lead, but again the Devils tied it. In the second period, Nash's goal gave Rangers a 3–2 lead that they would hold on to for the rest of the game. On March 21, Rangers were beaten by the Florida Panthers 3–1 on home ice. On March 23, Rangers were beaten 3–2 in the shootout by the Capitals. Two days later, the Rangers beat the Flyers on the road 5–2. They did not end the month well as they were shutout by the Senators and Montreal Canadiens, respectively.

April
The Rangers acquired Ryane Clowe on April 2, and on April 3, the day of the NHL trade deadline, they acquired Derick Brassard, Derek Dorsett and John Moore. Clowe, Brassard and Moore made their debuts with the Rangers on April 3 in a game against the Pittsburgh Penguins at Madison Square Garden, which the Rangers won 6–1. This trio made history as it was the first time in franchise history that three players making their debuts scored goals in the same game, as Brassard had a goal and three assists, Clowe had two goals and an assist, and Moore had one goal. Brassard's four points was also the most for a Rangers debut since Doug Bentley in 1954.

Standings

Divisional standings

Conference standings

Schedule and results

|- style="text-align:center; background:#fcc;"
| 1 || 19 || @ Boston Bruins || 1–3 || Lundqvist || 0–1–0
|- style="text-align:center; background:#fcc;"
| 2 || 20 || Pittsburgh Penguins || 3–6 || Lundqvist || 0–2–0
|-  style="text-align:center; background:#cfc;"
| 3 || 23 || Boston Bruins || 4–3 OT || Lundqvist || 1–2–0
|- style="text-align:center; background:#fcc;"
| 4 || 24 || @ Philadelphia Flyers || 1–2 || Lundqvist || 1–3–0
|-  style="text-align:center; background:#cfc;"
| 5 || 26 || Toronto Maple Leafs || 5–2 || Lundqvist || 2–3–0
|-  style="text-align:center; background:#cfc;"
| 6 || 29 || Philadelphia Flyers || 2–1 || Lundqvist || 3–3–0
|- style="text-align:center; background:#fcc;"
| 7 || 31 || Pittsburgh Penguins || 0–3 || Lundqvist || 3–4–0
|-

|-  style="text-align:center; background:#cfc;"
| 8 || 2 || @ Tampa Bay Lightning || 3–2 || Biron || 4–4–0
|- style="text-align:center; background:#fcc;"
| 9 || 5 || @ New Jersey Devils || 1–3 || Lundqvist || 4–5–0
|-  style="text-align:center; background:#cfc;"
| 10 || 7 || New York Islanders || 4–1 || Lundqvist || 5–5–0
|-  style="text-align:center; background:#cfc;"
| 11 || 10 || Tampa Bay Lightning || 5–1 || Lundqvist || 6–5–0
|-  style="text-align:center; background:#cfc;"
| 12 || 12 || @ Boston Bruins || 4–3 SO || Lundqvist || 7–5–0
|- style="text-align:center;" bgcolor="white"
| 13 || 14 || New York Islanders || 3–4 SO || Biron || 7–5–1
|-  style="text-align:center; background:#cfc;"
| 14 || 17 || Washington Capitals || 2–1 || Lundqvist || 8–5–1
|- style="text-align:center; background:#fcc;"
| 15 || 19 || Montreal Canadiens || 1–3 || Lundqvist || 8–6–1
|- style="text-align:center;" bgcolor="white"
| 16 || 21 || @ Ottawa Senators || 2–3 SO || Lundqvist || 8–6–2
|- style="text-align:center; background:#fcc;"
| 17 || 23 || @ Montreal Canadiens || 0–3 || Biron || 8–7–2
|- style="text-align:center; background:#fcc;"
| 18 || 26 || Winnipeg Jets || 3–4 || Lundqvist || 8–8–2
|-  style="text-align:center; background:#cfc;"
| 19 || 28 || Tampa Bay Lightning || 4–1 || Lundqvist || 9–8–2
|-

|-  style="text-align:center; background:#cfc;"
| 20 || 3 || Buffalo Sabres || 3–2 SO || Lundqvist || 10–8–2
|-  style="text-align:center; background:#cfc;"
| 21 || 5 || Philadelphia Flyers || 4–2 || Lundqvist || 11–8–2
|- style="text-align:center; background:#cfc;"
| 22 || 7 || @ New York Islanders || 2–1 OT || Lundqvist || 12–8–2
|- style="text-align:center; background:#fcc;"
| 23 || 8 || Ottawa Senators || 2–3 || Lundqvist || 12–9–2
|- style="text-align:center; background:#cfc;"
| 24 || 10 || @ Washington Capitals || 4–1 || Biron || 13–9–2
|- style="text-align:center; background:#fcc;"
| 25 || 12 || @ Buffalo Sabres || 1–3 || Lundqvist || 13–10–2
|- style="text-align:center; background:#fcc;"
| 26 || 14 || @ Winnipeg Jets || 1–3 || Lundqvist || 13–11–2
|- style="text-align:center; background:#fcc;"
| 27 || 16 || @ Pittsburgh Penguins || 0–3 || Lundqvist || 13–12–2
|- style="text-align:center; background:#cfc;"
| 28 || 18 || Carolina Hurricanes || 2–1 SO || Lundqvist || 14–12–2
|- style="text-align:center; background:#cfc;"
| 29 || 19 || @ New Jersey Devils || 3–2 || Lundqvist || 15–12–2
|- style="text-align:center; background:#fcc;"
| 30 || 21 || Florida Panthers || 1–3 || Lundqvist || 15–13–2
|- style="text-align:center;" bgcolor="white"
| 31 || 24 || Washington Capitals || 3–2 SO || Lundqvist || 15–13–3
|- style="text-align:center; background:#cfc;"
| 32 || 26 || @ Philadelphia Flyers || 5–2 || Lundqvist || 16–13–3
|- style="text-align:center; background:#fcc;"
| 33 || 28 || @ Ottawa Senators || 0–3 || Lundqvist || 16–14–3
|- style="text-align:center; background:#fcc;"
| 34 || 30 || @ Montreal Canadiens || 0–3 || Biron || 16–15–3
|-

|- style="text-align:center; background:#cfc;"
| 35 || 1 || Winnipeg Jets || 4–2 || Lundqvist || 17–15–3
|- style="text-align:center; background:#cfc;"
| 36 || 3 || Pittsburgh Penguins || 6–1 || Lundqvist || 18–15–3
|- style="text-align:center;" bgcolor="white"
| 37 || 5 || @ Pittsburgh Penguins || 1–2 SO || Lundqvist || 18–15–4
|- style="text-align:center; background:#cfc;"
| 38 || 6 || @ Carolina Hurricanes || 4–1 || Lundqvist || 19–15–4
|- style="text-align:center; background:#fcc;"
| 39 || 8 || @ Toronto Maple Leafs || 3–4 || Lundqvist || 19–16–4
|- style="text-align:center; background:#cfc;"
| 40 || 10 || Toronto Maple Leafs || 3–2 SO || Lundqvist || 20–16–4
|- style="text-align:center; background:#cfc;"
| 41 || 13 || @ New York Islanders || 1–0 OT || Lundqvist || 21–16–4
|- style="text-align:center; background:#fcc;"
| 42 || 16 || @ Philadelphia Flyers || 2–4 || Lundqvist || 21–17–4
|- style="text-align:center; background:#cfc;"
| 43 || 18 || Florida Panthers || 6–1 || Lundqvist || 22–17–4
|- style="text-align:center; background:#cfc;"
| 44 || 19 || @ Buffalo Sabres || 8–4 || Lundqvist || 23–17–4
|- style="text-align:center; background:#cfc;"
| 45 || 21 || New Jersey Devils || 4–1 || Lundqvist || 24–17–4
|- style="text-align:center; background:#fcc;"
| 46 || 23 || @ Florida Panthers || 2–3 || Lundqvist || 24–18–4
|- style="text-align:center; background:#cfc;"
| 47 || 25 || @ Carolina Hurricanes || 4–3 OT || Lundqvist || 25–18–4
|- style="text-align:center; background:#cfc"
| 48 || 27 || New Jersey Devils || 4–0 || Lundqvist || 26–18–4
|-

Playoffs

The New York Rangers ended the 2012–13 regular season as the Eastern Conference's 6th seed. They faced the #3 seed Washington Capitals in the first round of the playoffs and won 4 games to 3. They were defeated by the #4 seed Boston Bruins in the Eastern Conference semi-finals.

Key:  Win  Loss

|- style="text-align:center; background:#fcc;"
| 1 || May 2 || 7:30 pm || @ Washington Capitals || 1–3 || Lundqvist || Capitals lead 1–0
|- style="text-align:center; background:#fcc;"
| 2 || May 4 || 12:30 pm || @ Washington Capitals || 0–1 OT || Lundqvist || Capitals lead 2–0
|- style="text-align:center; background:#cfc;"
| 3 || May 6 || 7:30 pm || Washington Capitals || 4–3 || Lundqvist || Capitals lead 2–1
|- style="text-align:center; background:#cfc;"
| 4 || May 8 || 7:30 pm || Washington Capitals || 4–3 || Lundqvist || Series tied 2–2
|- style="text-align:center; background:#fcc;" 
| 5 || May 10 || 7:30 pm || @ Washington Capitals || 1–2 OT || Lundqvist || Capitals lead 3–2
|- style="text-align:center; background:#cfc;"
| 6 || May 12 || 4:30 pm || Washington Capitals || 1–0 || Lundqvist || Series tied 3–3
|-  style="text-align:center; background:#cfc;"
| 7 || May 13 || 8:00 pm || @ Washington Capitals || 5–0 || Lundqvist || Rangers win 4–3
|-

|- style="text-align:center; background:#fcc;" 
| 1 || May 16 || 7:30 pm || @ Boston Bruins || 2–3 OT || Lundqvist || Bruins lead 1–0
|- style="text-align:center; background:#fcc;"
| 2 || May 19 || 3:00 pm || @ Boston Bruins || 2–5 || Lundqvist || Bruins lead 2–0
|- style="text-align:center; background:#fcc;"
| 3 || May 21 || 7:30 pm || Boston Bruins || 1–2 || Lundqvist || Bruins lead 3–0
|-  style="text-align:center; background:#cfc;"
| 4 || May 23 || 7:00 pm || Boston Bruins || 4–3 OT || Lundqvist || Bruins lead 3–1
|- style="text-align:center; background:#fcc;"
| 5 || May 25 || 5:30 pm || @ Boston Bruins || 1–3 || Lundqvist || Bruins win series 4–1
|-

Player statistics
Final stats
Skaters

Goaltenders

†Denotes player spent time with another team before joining the Rangers.  Stats reflect time with the Rangers only.
‡Traded mid-season
Bold/italics denotes franchise record

Awards and records

Awards

Milestones

|}

Transactions
The Rangers have been involved in the following transactions during the 2012–13 season:

Trades

Free agents signed

Free agents lost

Claimed via waivers

Lost via waivers

Lost via buyout

Player signings

Draft picks

New York Rangers' picks at the 2012 NHL Entry Draft, held in Pittsburgh, Pennsylvania on June 22 & 23, 2012.

Draft notes
 The New York Rangers' third-round pick went to the Nashville Predators as the result of a June 23, 2012 trade that sent a 2013 third-round pick to the Rangers in exchange for this pick.
 The Nashville Predators' fifth-round pick went to the New York Rangers as a result of a June 23, 2012 trade that sent 2013 fifth-round pick to the Predators in exchange for this pick.
 The New York Rangers' fifth-round pick went to the Chicago Blackhawks as the result of a February 27, 2012 trade that sent John Scott to the Rangers in exchange for this pick.
 The New York Rangers' sixth-round pick went to the Nashville Predators as the result of a June 25, 2011 trade that sent a 2011 sixth-round pick to the Rangers in exchange for this pick.
 The New York Rangers' seventh-round pick went to the Toronto Maple Leafs as the result of a December 11, 2011 trade that sent John Mitchell to the Rangers in exchange for this pick.

See also 
 2012–13 NHL season

References

New York Rangers seasons
New York Rangers
New York Rangers
New York Rangers
New York Rangers
 in Manhattan
Madison Square Garden